Mé-Zóchi is a district of São Tomé and Príncipe, on São Tomé Island. With 44,752 residents (2012) rising to 50,800 in 2018, it is the second most populous district of the country. The district seat is Trindade. It is divided into the five statistical subdistricts Trindade, Madalena, Caixão Grande, Bombom and Almas.

Geography
The western part of the district is mountainous, and lies partly in the Parque Natural Obô de São Tomé. The eastern part is densely populated, due to the proximity of the city São Tomé. It has a short coastline.

Population

Settlements
The main settlement is the town Trindade. Other settlements are:

Água Creola
Água Gunu
Alice
Almas
Batepá
Blublu 
Bobo Foro
Bombaim 
Bombom 
Caixão Grande
Caminho Novo
Cruzeiro
Folha Fede
Java
Lemos
Madalena
Monte Café
Ototó
Plateau
Piedade
Praia Melão
Quinta da Graça
Santa Cruz
São Nicolau
Diogo Simão
Santa Margarida

Economy
The main economic activity in the district is agriculture, and it forms a large part of the national agricultural production. Coffee and cocoa are the main products, these are also the main export products of the country. The district has 26.28% of the farmers of the country.

Politics
Lobata currently has 13 seats in the National Assembly.

Notable  people
Almada Negreiros, painter and artist
Francisco Fortunato Pires, National Assembly member from 1994 to 2002
Filipe Santo, singer, winner of the Best Album at the 2nd STP Music Awards in 2016

Twin town
The district is twinned with:
Borba, Portugal
Guimarães, Portugal
Sintra, Portugal
Vagos, Portugal
Valongo, Portugal

References

 
Districts of São Tomé and Príncipe
São Tomé Island